Cryptocochylis is a genus of moths belonging to the  family Tortricidae. It contains only one species, Cryptocochylis conjunctana, which is found in Germany, Italy, Croatia, Hungary, Ukraine, Romania, Bulgaria, North Macedonia, Greece and Asia Minor.

The larvae feed on Achillea nobilis.

See also
List of Tortricidae genera

References

External links
tortricidae.com

Cochylini
Monotypic moth genera
Moths of Europe
Moths of Asia
Tortricidae genera